Phidian may refer to 
Phidias, 5th century BC Greek sculptor
the art of sculpture